John Donald Black (June 6, 1883 – April 12, 1960) was an American economist. He was a professor of economics at University of Minnesota from 1918 to 1927, and then from 1927 to 1956 at Harvard University. Black was one of the authors of the Agricultural Adjustment Act. He was also president of the American Economic Association in 1955. Black died at a Boston hospital in 1960.

Bibliography

 (1926) Production Economics. George G. Harrap and Co.
 (1942) Parity, parity, parity. The Harvard Committee on Research in the Social Sciences. 
 (1944) Food Enough: Science for War and Peace Series. American Journal of Agricultural Economics. 
 (1950) The Rural Economy of New England: A Regional Study. Harvard University Press. ASIN B0000CHSFH. 
 (1951) Interregional Competition in Agriculture: With Special Reference to Dairy Farming in the Lake States and New England. Harvard Economic Studies.  
 (1955) Farm and Other Operating-unit Land-use Planning. 
 (1960) Rural Planning of One County: Worcester County, Massachusetts. The University of Chicago Press, Journal of Political Economy.

References

External links 
 

1883 births
1960 deaths
People from Cambridge, Wisconsin
University of Wisconsin–Madison alumni
Harvard University faculty
University of Minnesota faculty
Presidents of the American Economic Association
20th-century American economists
Economists from Wisconsin